is a railway station in Mihara, Hiroshima Prefecture, Japan, operated by West Japan Railway Company (JR West).

Lines
Hongō Station is served by the Sanyō Main Line.

Layout
The station has two side platforms and a station office on ground level. The two platforms are connected by a footbridge.

See also
 List of railway stations in Japan

External links

  

Railway stations in Japan opened in 1894
Railway stations in Hiroshima Prefecture
Sanyō Main Line